Ernest Alfred Johnson (18 November 1912 – 29 November 1997) was a British track cyclist who competed in the 1932 Summer Olympics and in the 1936 Summer Olympics. He was born in Putney, London and died in Kingsbridge, Devon.

He won two bronze medals with the British pursuit team in 1932 and 1936.

References

External links

1912 births
1997 deaths
English male cyclists
English track cyclists
Olympic cyclists of Great Britain
Cyclists at the 1932 Summer Olympics
Cyclists at the 1936 Summer Olympics
Olympic bronze medallists for Great Britain
Olympic medalists in cycling
People from Putney
Cyclists from Greater London
Medalists at the 1932 Summer Olympics
Medalists at the 1936 Summer Olympics